Skechers USA, Inc. is an American multinational footwear company. Headquartered in Manhattan Beach, California, it was founded in 1992 and is the third largest footwear brand in the United States.

History
Skechers was founded in 1992 by Robert Greenberg, who had previously founded LA Gear in 1983 (he stepped down as CEO of that company the same year he founded Skechers). Greenberg sought to focus on men's street shoes; Skechers' early products were utility-style boots popular in grunge fashion. The company quickly expanded to include women and children, with casual and athletic styles, and went public in 1999. In 2011, Skechers launched its performance line for athletes and signed Meb Keflezighi as a spokesman.

Skechers is the third largest footwear brand in the United States by revenue. In January 2019, the company started an expansion of its corporate headquarters to double its office, design and showroom space in the South Bay.

Litigation
In 2012, Skechers agreed to settle a class action lawsuit for $40 million based on a U.S. Federal Trade Commission complaint that it had misled customers with its Shape-Ups ads. In 2019, Nike filed a patent infringement lawsuit against Skechers because, according to Nike, Skechers had infringed on the design of their VaporMax and Air Max 270 sneakers.

Forced labor investigation 
In 2021, French prosecutors launched an investigation into whether Skechers and other brands had concealed or profited from forced Uyghur labor. Skechers has found no evidence of forced labor taking place.

Products and advertising 
Skechers designs, develops and markets a range of lifestyle and performance footwear, apparel and accessories for adults and children. Its brands include Skechers Sport, Slip-ins, D'Lites, the charity line Bobs, Our Planet Matters, Mark Nason, Skechers Work, Go Walk, Go Run, and Go Golf. Since 2020, select shoes have utilized Goodyear rubber.

Skechers has promoted its products with celebrities including singers Ava Max and Cha Eun-woo; television personalities Martha Stewart, Brooke Burke, and Amanda Kloots; baseball player Clayton Kershaw and boxer Sugar Ray Leonard; footballers Jamie Redknapp and Michael Ballack; and American football players Tony Romo, Howie Long, and Cris Carter. Skechers Performance has featured distance runner Meb Keflezighi and professional golfers Brooke Henderson and Matt Fitzpatrick.

Since 2010, Skechers has been a regular Super Bowl advertiser, with spots featuring Kim Kardashian, Willie Nelson, and Snoop Dogg.

On March 1, 2019, Skechers launched a print and digital comparative advertising campaign titled "Just Blew It" to highlight the Zion Williamson failed shoe incident with rival Nike.

In 2022, the brand expanded into pickleball, signing several of the sport's top players and sponsoring the first nationally televised pickleball tournament in the U.S.

Golf sponsorships

  Brooke Henderson
  Emily Pedersen
  Matt Fitzpatrick
  Russell Knox
  Colin Montgomerie
  Belén Mozo
  Billy Andrade
  Matt Atkins
  Wesley Bryan
  Matt Kuchar
  Ashlan Ramsey

Philanthropy
Skechers launched its Skechers Foundation in 2010. Skechers and the Friendship Foundation host an annual walk in Manhattan Beach to raise money for a nonprofit that helps connect special-needs students with their peers.

Skechers donates new shoes to children in need worldwide through its Bobs charity program. The shoes support Head Start programs, education foundations, homeless shelters, disaster relief and 501(c)(3) nonprofit organizations. Bobs also support Petco Love, Woodgreen Pets Charity, and other animal welfare groups.

Entertainment
Skechers has developed—with MoonScoop Group and animator/co-producer John Massé—an animated series, Zevo-3, and several direct-to-DVD features produced by SD Entertainment:
Twinkle Toes (2012)
Hydee and the Hytops: The Movie (2013)
Twinkle Toes Lights Up New York (2016)

References

External links
 
  (consumer)
  (corporate)

1992 establishments in California
1999 initial public offerings
1990s fashion
2000s fashion
American companies established in 1992
Athletic shoe brands
Clothing brands of the United States
Clothing companies based in Los Angeles
Clothing companies established in 1992
Companies based in Los Angeles County, California
Companies listed on the New York Stock Exchange
Manhattan Beach, California
Manufacturing companies based in Greater Los Angeles
Manufacturing companies established in 1992
Shoe brands
Shoe companies of the United States
Sportswear brands